Kinnernet is a series of invitation-only unconference events formed by entrepreneurs, technologists, startup founders, scientists, media professionals, and creatives.

Format
Described as "a wild out of the box, irreverent, bottom-up innovation, creativity and cultural unconference", the event gathers each year 100-200 innovators working in the media, art, technology or creative industries, with the mission to: "meet, share our visions and invent desirable futures together".

The  festival mixes in depth conversations, debates, workshops, but also creative and artistic moments. All participants are equal and contributors and set up the programme by posting the topics on their minds on large wiki-boards. The Festival aims to create and develop each year innovative and contributive projects.

Forbes described it as follows: "Take the ‘no speakers or topics’ mantra to the extreme and you have the unconference [...] Gather an invitation-only list of fantastic people, give them an empty dry erase board with meeting times and locations and let the magic happen."

History
The first Kinnernet event was held in the spring of 2003, organised by Yossi Vardi, founding investor of ICQ

The conference is invitation-only and self-organized, originally inspired by Tim O'Reilly's Foo Camp.

Some discussion points become topics at TheMarker, a two-day Internet business conference in Tel Aviv.

Since its inception, Kinnernets have opened throughout the world, including Avallon (France), Venice (Italy), Alcobaça (Portugal), Vihula Manhor (Estonia), and Ciudad del Saber (Panama).

Locations
 Nes Hrim, Israel, since 2003 (link)
 Avallon, France, since 2013 (link)
 Vernice, Italy, since 2017 (link)
 Alcobaça, Portugal, since 2018 (link)
 Vihula Manor, Estonia, since 2019 (link)
 Ciudad del Saber, Panama, since 2019 (link)

References

External links

Internet culture
Web-related conferences